Curcuma phaeocaulis is a species of flowering plant in the ginger family. It was first described by Theodoric Valeton.

Range
It is native to the Chinese province of Yunnan. It is cultivated in the Chinese provinces of Fujian, Guangdong, Guangxi, and Sichuan. It is also cultivated in Indonesia and Vietnam.

References 

phaeocaulis